The LG KF900, also known as the LG Prada II, is a touchscreen, with slide out qwerty keyboard, mobile phone made by LG Electronics. It is the second version of the Prada phone, following the original LG Prada (KE850). The phone's looks are basically the same as the original Prada, but the Prada II is slightly thicker, taller and heavier, to support a slide-out full QWERTY keyboard. There is also a front-facing camera for use with video calling. The interface has been updated from the original. The camera has been increased from 2 to 5 megapixels with a LED photolight. The Prada II also now supports 3G and HSDPA for faster internet browsing.
The Prada II has support for the Prada Link, which is bluetooth watch that allows information on incoming phone calls or text messages, the phone's alarm, or the world time clock.

The LG Prada II (KF900) was announced on October 13, 2008. It was released in December 2008.

Features 
 Capacitive, Multi-touch Touch Screen
 Music Player (MP3, AAC, AAC+, WMA, RA)
 Multitasking
 Video Player (MPEG4, H.263, H.264)
 Active flash UI
 Document Viewer (ppt, doc, xls, pdf, txt )
 Accelerometer
 Full QWERTY keyboard

Specifications 

General
Form Factor: Touchscreen with slide-out qwerty keyboard
Dimensions: 104.4×54×16.75 mm
Weight: 130 g
Main Screen Type: TFT multi-touch touchscreen, 256K colors
Main Screen Size/Resolution: 240 x 400 pixels, 3 inches
Messaging: SMS, EMS, MMS, Email
Operating System: Flash UI
Built-in Hands-free: Yes
Voice-dial/memo: Yes
Vibration: Yes
Organizer: Yes
Office Document Viewer: .ppt, .doc, .xls, .pdf, .txt
Battery Stand-By: Up to 400 h
Battery Talk Time: Up to 3 h

Connectivity3G Network: GSM 900 / 1800 / 1900
HSDPA: 7.2 Mbit/s
Blue-tooth: Yes, v2.0 with A2DP
USB: Yes, v2.0
WiFiMultimedia'
Main camera: 5 MP, 2592x1944 pixels, with Schneider-Kreuznach certified lens
Front-facing camera: used for video calling
Internal Memory: 60 MB shared memory
Memory Slot: microSD (TransFlash), up to 8GB
Music: MP3, WAV, WMA, MIDI, AAC, AAC+, eAAC+, RA, AMR-NB
Video:  MPEG4, H.263, H.264, 3GP, RV
Radio: Yes
Ringtones: Polyphonic (40 channels), MP3
Speakers: Built-in handsfree

Latest Software Version: V10P (download located here)

See also 
 LG Prada (KE850)
 LG Prada 3.0 (P940)

References

External links 
 LG KF900 - LG Electronics

KF900
Portable media players
Mobile phones with an integrated hardware keyboard
Videotelephony
Prada